The women's team time trial of the 1993 UCI Road World Championships cycling event took place on 25 August 1993 in Oslo, Norway. The course was 50 km long.

Final classification

Source

References

1993 UCI Road World Championships
UCI Road World Championships – Women's team time trial
UCI